The 2019 Morelos Open was a professional tennis tournament played on outdoor hard courts. It was the sixth edition of the tournament which was part of the 2019 ATP Challenger Tour. It took place in Cuernavaca, Mexico between 18–24 February 2019.

Singles main draw entrants

Seeds 

 1 Rankings as of 11 February 2019.

Other entrants 
The following players received wildcards into the singles main draw:
  Lucas Gómez
  Alex Hernández
  Gerardo López Villaseñor
  Luis Patiño
  Manuel Sánchez

The following players received entry into the singles main draw using protected rankings:
  Facundo Mena
  Daniel Nguyen

The following player received entry into the singles main draw as an alternate:
  Johannes Härteis

The following players received entry into the singles main draw using their ITF World Tennis Ranking:
  Matías Franco Descotte
  João Menezes
  João Souza
  Camilo Ugo Carabelli

The following players received entry from the qualifying draw:
  Manuel Guinard
  Gonzalo Villanueva

Champions

Singles 

 Matías Franco Descotte def.  Gonzalo Escobar 6–1, 6–4.

Doubles 

 André Göransson /  Marc-Andrea Hüsler def.  Gonzalo Escobar /  Luis David Martínez 6–3, 3–6, [11–9].

2019
Morelos Open
2019 in Mexican tennis
February 2019 sports events in Mexico